Archibald Murphy Currie (August 31, 1893 – June 18, 1939) was a pitcher in Major League Baseball. He played for the St. Louis Cardinals in 1916.

References

External links

1893 births
1939 deaths
Major League Baseball pitchers
St. Louis Cardinals players
Baseball players from North Carolina
Sportspeople from Fayetteville, North Carolina
Chattanooga Lookouts players
Raleigh Capitals players